Ma-Anne Dionisio (born 16 July 1973) is a Filipino-Canadian singer and actress.

Early life 
She is the middle child of five sisters; her parents moved the family from the Philippines to Canada in 1990.

Career 
After some encouragement from people who had heard her sing, she won a leading role in Experience Canada, a musical tour that celebrated Canada's 125th anniversary. A TV presentation of the show was seen by someone in the Toronto casting department Miss Saigon who arranged for an audition for the role of Kim in the musical. She won the role and was a celebrated success, earning  nominations for the Dora Mavor Moore Award for Best Actress in a Musical in 1994 and in 2011. Dionisio has since performed as Kim in British, Australian and American productions of Miss Saigon.

She played the role of Éponine in the U.S. touring company of Les Misérables, joining Lea Salonga as the second Asian to play Éponine in western theater.

She played Bertrande de Rols in Martin Guerre in London, performed in West Side Story as Maria at the Stratford Festival in 1999, and appeared on Broadway as Little Girl in the 2002 revival of Flower Drum Song.

In July 2008, Dionisio reprised her original role as Kim in the seated production of Miss Saigon at The Muny in St. Louis, Missouri. In July 2010, she also reprised this role in the second Toronto, Ontario, Canada production. She originally played this role in the original Toronto production in 1993, which also launched her career.

She is a founding artist of Theatre 20, a musical theatre company in Toronto formed by artists in 2009, and performed in Theatre 20's 2011 Concert Series at the Panasonic Theatre.

She has also had occasional film and television roles, including guest appearances in Flashpoint, Remedy and Schitt's Creek and a lead role in the film The Waiting Room.

Theatre 
 Miss Saigon (Toronto) 1993 - Kim
 Les Misérables (US Tour) - Eponine
 Miss Saigon (West End) - Kim
 Martin Guerre (West End) - Bertrande
 Miss Saigon (Sydney) - Kim
 Next to Normal (Toronto) 2019 - Diana Goodman

References

External links
http://www.ibdb.com/person.asp?ID=102565

Canadian musical theatre actresses
Filipino emigrants to Canada
Filipino expatriates in Canada
Living people
Actresses from Manila
Actresses from Toronto
1973 births
Canadian film actresses
Canadian television actresses
Canadian actresses of Filipino descent